Haplochrois is a genus of moths in the family Elachistidae, though some classifications place it in the Agonoxenidae, Coleophoridae or Cosmopterigidae.

Selected species
 Haplochrois albanica (Rebel & Zerny, 1932)
 Haplochrois bipunctella (Chambers, 1880)
 Haplochrois buvati Baldizzone, 1985
 Haplochrois chlorometalla Meyrick, 1897
 Haplochrois coleophorella (Sinev, 1993) 
 Haplochrois galapagosalis Landry, 2001
 Haplochrois ganota (Meyrick, 1911)
 Haplochrois gelechiella Rebel, 1902
 Haplochrois guttata Busck, 1914
 Haplochrois halans (Meyrick, 1924)
 Haplochrois hysterota (Meyrick, 1918)
 Haplochrois ochraceella Rebel, 1903
 Haplochrois otiosa Walsingham, 1909
 Haplochrois picropa (Meyrick, 1921)
 Haplochrois tanyptera Turner, 1923
 Haplochrois thalycra Meyrick, 1897
 Haplochrois theae (Kusnezov, 1916)

References
Natural History Museum Lepidoptera genus database

Elachistidae